William Paulet, 3rd Marquess of Winchester  ( – 24 November 1598) was an English nobleman, the son of John Paulet, 2nd Marquess of Winchester and his first wife, Elizabeth Willoughby. His maternal grandfather was Robert Willoughby, 2nd Baron Willoughby de Broke.

He was made a Knight of the Bath at the coronation of Mary I on 30 November 1553.

Career
The offices he held during his career included:
 Justice of the Peace, Hampshire from c.1559
 Sheriff of Hampshire 1560–61
 Justice of the Peace, Dorset from 1564
 Commissioner for the Musters, Dorset 1569
 High Steward, Dorchester by 1570
 Joint Lord Lieutenant of Dorset 1569 and 1585/6-98
 Member of Parliament for Dorset 1571
 Joint Lord Lieutenant of Hampshire 1585
 Lord Lieutenant of Hampshire 1585–86
 Lord High Steward for the funeral of Mary, Queen of Scots, 1 August 1587
 Lord Lieutenant of Hampshire 1596
 Commissioner for Ecclesiastical Causes, Diocese of Winchester 1597

Paulet was summoned to Parliament on 5 May 1572 in his father's Barony of St John. He succeeded his father as 3rd Marquess of Winchester on 4 November 1576. During October 1586, he was one of the judges at the trial of Mary, Queen of Scots, later acting as Lord High Steward at her funeral on 1 August 1587.

He is known as the author of The Lord Marquess Idleness, a remarkable and most ingenious acrostic of six Latin verses. It was published in 1586 and 1587.

Marriage and issue
Between 20 June 1544 and 10 February 1547/1548 he married Anne or Agnes Howard, daughter of William Howard, 1st Baron Howard of Effingham and his first wife, Katherine Broughton and had issue:
 William Paulet, 4th Marquess of Winchester, died 4 February 1629, married Lucy Cecil, daughter of Thomas Cecil, 1st Earl of Exeter
 Anne Paulet, born 1552, married Sir Thomas Denys (modern spelling: Dennis), of Holcombe Burnell, Devon; grandparents of the prodigy Denys Rolle
 Katherine Paulet, married Sir Giles Wroughton
 Elizabeth Paulet, married Sir Edward Hoby
The marriage was not a happy one, and the couple were only reconciled, on one occasion, by Elizabeth I's intervention.

Paulet also had children with his recognised mistress Jane Lambert, who later married the much younger Sir Gerrard Fleetwood:

 Sir William Paulet, died 1628, lawyer, London, later of Edington, Wiltshire. High Sheriff of Wiltshire 1613, married Elizabeth, daughter of Sir John Seymour
 Sir John Paulet, lawyer, Winchester, married Elizabeth, daughter of John Stump
 Sir Hercules Paulet, born 1574, married Bridgett, daughter of Sir Henry Gifford
 Hector Paulet, born 1578, married Joan Butler
 Susan or Susanna Paulet, married firstly Thomas Kirkby and secondly Launcelott Warnfford

Death
He died on 24 November 1598 and was buried at Basing, Hampshire. His widow, Anne Paulet, died on 18 November 1601. The date of Jane Lambert's death is not recorded.

References

Bibliography

External links
 William Paulet, Marquess of Winchester Family tree
 PAULET, Sir William (c.1532–98), of Hooke Court, Dorset A biography
 William Paulet, 3rd M. of Winchester His family and details of his life

|-

1532 births
1598 deaths
Lord-Lieutenants of Dorset
Lord-Lieutenants of Hampshire
16th-century English nobility
William
People from Basingstoke and Deane
3
Burials at St. Mary's Church, Old Basing